This is a list of lakes and reservoirs in England.

Largest lakes and reservoirs by surface area

Lakes larger than 5 hectares 

This list is restricted to open bodies of fresh-water over 5 ha in area, because of the difficulty in establishing what is a pond and what is a lake.

It excludes service reservoirs used within the water supply network for the storage of drinking water and excludes water bodies on industrial sites used exclusively for industrial purposes (works ponds).

A
Abberton Reservoir - Essex
Agden Reservoir - South Yorkshire
Aldenham Reservoir - Hertfordshire
Alderfen Broad - Norfolk
Anglezarke Reservoir - Lancashire
Angram Reservoir - North Yorkshire
Aqualate mere- Staffordshire/Shropshire
Ardingly Reservoir - West Sussex
Ardleigh Reservoir - Essex
Argal and College Reservoirs - Cornwall
Arnfield Reservoir - Derbyshire
Arrow Valley Lake - Worcestershire 
Ashford Reservoir - Somerset
Ashworth Moor Reservoir - Lancashire
Audenshaw Reservoirs - Greater Manchester
Avon Dam Reservoir - Devon

B
Baitings Reservoir - West Yorkshire
Bakethin Reservoir - Northumberland
Balderhead Reservoir - County Durham
Banbury Reservoir - Greater London
Barrow Gurney Tanks - Somerset
Bartley Reservoir - West Midlands
Barton Broad - Norfolk
Bassenthwaite Lake - Cumbria
Beaver Dyke Reservoirs - West Yorkshire
Belaugh Broad - Norfolk
Belmont Reservoir - Lancashire
Belvide Reservoir - Staffordshire
Benacre Broad - Suffolk
Besom Hill Reservoir - Greater Manchester
Bessborough Reservoir - Surrey
Bewl Water - Kent/East Sussex
Bittell Reservoirs (Upper and Lower) - Worcestershire
Black Moss Reservoirs - Greater Manchester
Blackbrook Reservoir - Leicestershire
Blackmoorfoot Reservoir - West Yorkshire
Blackstone Edge Reservoir - Greater Manchester
Blackton Reservoir - County Durham
Blagdon Lake - Somerset
Blithfield Reservoir - Staffordshire
Boddington Reservoir - Northamptonshire
Bolton Reservoir - Greater Manchester
Bomere Pool - Shropshire
Booth Wood Reservoir - West Yorkshire
Borrans Reservoir - Cumbria
Boscathnoe Reservoir - Cornwall
Bosley Reservoir - Cheshire
Bottoms Reservoir - Derbyshire
Bough Beech Reservoir - Kent
Brent Reservoir (also known as the Welsh Harp) - Greater London
Bridge Broad - Norfolk
Broad Fen - Norfolk
Broadstone Reservoir - South Yorkshire 
Brookvale Park Lake - West Midlands
Broomhead Reservoir - South Yorkshire
Brownhouse Wham Reservoir - Lancashire
Brundall Broad  - Norfolk
Brushes Clough Reservoir - Greater Manchester
Brushes Reservoir - Greater Manchester
Burnhope Reservoir - County Durham
Burnt Fen Broad - Norfolk
Burrator Reservoir - Devon
Bussow Reservoir - Cornwall
Buttermere - Cumbria

C
Calf Hey Reservoir - Lancashire
Calthorpe Broad - Norfolk
Cargenwen Reservoir - Cornwall
Carleton Broad - Norfolk
Carsington Reservoir - Derbyshire
Castleshaw Reservoir - Greater Manchester
Catcleugh Reservoir - Northumberland
Catfield Broad - Norfolk
Caversham Lakes- Berkshire
Challacombe Reservoir - Devon
Chapelhouse Reservoir - Cumbria
Chard Reservoir - Somerset
Chasewater - Staffordshire
Cheddar Reservoir - Somerset
Chelburn Reservoir - Greater Manchester
Chelker Reservoir - North Yorkshire
Chelmarsh Reservoir - Shropshire
Chew Reservoir- Greater Manchester
Chew Valley Lake - Somerset
Clattercote Reservoir - Oxfordshire 
Clatworthy Reservoir - Somerset
Cockshoot Broad - Norfolk
Cod Beck Reservoir - North Yorkshire
Colemere - Shropshire
Colliford Lake - Cornwall
Colt Crag Reservoir - Northumberland
Coniston Water - Cumbria
Covehithe Broad - Suffolk
Covenham Reservoir - Lincolnshire
Cow Green Reservoir - Cumbria
Cowm Reservoir - Lancashire
Cransley Reservoir - Northamptonshire
Crome's Broad - Norfolk
Crook Gate Reservoir- Greater Manchester
Cropston Reservoir - Leicestershire
Crowdy Reservoir- Cornwall
Crummock Water - Cumbria

D
Dale Dyke Reservoir - South Yorkshire
Damflask Reservoir - South Yorkshire
Darracott Reservoir- Devon
Darwell Reservoir - East Sussex
Daventry Country Park reservoir - Northamptonshire
Decoy Broad - Norfolk
Delph Reservoir - Lancashire
Denton Reservoirs - Greater Manchester
Derwent Reservoir - Derbyshire
Derwent Reservoir - County Durham
Derwent Water - Cumbria
Devoke Water - Cumbria
Diggle Reservoir- Greater Manchester
Dilham Broad - Norfolk
Dingle Reservoir - Lancashire
Dorney Lake - Buckinghamshire
Dovestones Reservoir - Greater Manchester
Dowdeswell Reservoir - Gloucestershire
Dowry Reservoir - Greater Manchester
Dozmary Pool - Cornwall
Draycote Water - Warwickshire
Drayton Reservoir - Northamptonshire  
Drift Reservoir - Cornwall
Dubbs Reservoir  - Cumbria
Durleigh reservoir - Somerset

E
Earlswood Lakes - Warwickshire
East Warwick Reservoir - Greater London
Easton Broad - Suffolk
Eccup Reservoir - West Yorkshire
Edgbaston Reservoir - West Midlands
Elsecar Reservoir - South Yorkshire
Elslack Reservoir - North Yorkshire
Embsay Reservoir - North Yorkshire
Emborough Pond - Somerset
Ennerdale Water - Cumbria
Errwood Reservoir - Derbyshire
Esthwaite Water - Cumbria
Eyebrook Reservoir - Leicestershire/Rutland

F
Farmoor Reservoir - Oxfordshire
Fernilee Reservoir - Derbyshire
Fernworthy Reservoir- Devon
Fewston Reservoir - Yorkshire
Filby Broad - Norfolk
Fisher Tarn - Cumbria
Fleet Pond - Hampshire
Fontburn Reservoir - Northumberland
Fonthill Lake - Wiltshire
Fountains Fell Tarn - Yorkshire
Foxcote Reservoir - Buckinghamshire
Frankley Reservoir - West Midlands

G
Gailey Reservoir - Staffordshire
Gammaton Reservoirs - Devon
Gormire Lake - North Yorkshire
Gorton Reservoirs - Greater Manchester
Gouthwaite Reservoir - North Yorkshire
Grafham Water - Cambridgeshire
Grasmere - Cumbria
Grassholme Reservoir- County Durham
Green Withens Reservoir - West Yorkshire
Greenbooth Reservoir - Greater Manchester
Greenfield Reservoir - Greater Manchester
Grimwith Reservoir - North Yorkshire

H
Hallington Reservoirs - Northumberland
Hamer Pasture Reservoir - Greater Manchester
Hanch Reservoir - Staffordshire
Hanging Lees Reservoir - Greater Manchester
Hanningfield Reservoir - Essex
Hardley Flood - Norfolk
Harlock Reservoir - Cumbria 
Hatherton Reservoir - Staffordshire
Haweswater Reservoir - Cumbria
Hawkridge Reservoir - Somerset
Hayeswater - Cumbria
Heaton Park Reservoir - Greater Manchester
Hickling Broad - Norfolk
High Maynard Reservoir- Greater London
High Rid Reservoir - Greater Manchester
Higher Swineshaw Reservoir - Greater Manchester
Hisehope Reservoir- County Durham
Holden Wood Reservoir - Lancashire
Hollingworth Lake - Greater Manchester
Hollowell reservoir  - Northamptonshire
Holywell Reservoir- Devon
Hornsea Mere - East Riding of Yorkshire
Horsey Mere - Norfolk
Hoveton Great Broad - Norfolk
Hoveton Little Broad - Norfolk
Howden Reservoir - South Yorkshire
Hurworth Burn Reservoir- County Durham
Hury Reservoir- County Durham

I
Ingbirchworth Reservoir - South Yorkshire
Island Barn Reservoir - Surrey

J
Jennetts Reservoir- Devon
Jumbles Reservoir - Lancashire

K
Kennick Reservoir- Devon
Kentmere Reservoir - Cumbria
Kielder Water - Northumberland
Killington Reservoir - Cumbria
King George V Reservoir - Greater London
King George VI Reservoir - Surrey
Kitcliffe Reservoir - Greater Manchester
Knight Reservoir - Surrey
Knighton Reservoir - Shropshire
Knipton Reservoir - Leicestershire
Knypersley Reservoir - Staffordshire

L
Ladybower Reservoir - Derbyshire
Lamaload Reservoir - Cheshire
Laneshaw Reservoir - Lancashire
Langsett Reservoir - South Yorkshire
Leigh Reservoir - Somerset
Leighton Reservoir - North Yorkshire
Lifford Reservoir - West Midlands 
Light Hazzles Reservoir - Greater Manchester
Lily Broad - Norfolk
Lindley Wood Reservoir - North Yorkshire
Little Swinburne Reservoir - Northumberland
Litton Reservoirs - Somerset
Lockwood Reservoir- Greater London
Longdendale Chain of reservoirs - Derbyshire
Lothing Lake - Suffolk
Low Maynard Reservoir- Greater London
Lower Chelburn Reservoir - Greater Manchester
Lower Rivington Reservoir - Lancashire
Lower Roddlesworth Reservoir - Lancashire
Lower Swineshaw Reservoir - Greater Manchester
Loweswater - Cumbria
Lumley Moor Reservoir - North Yorkshire
Luxhay Reservoir - Somerset

M
Malham Tarn - North Yorkshire
Malthouse Broad - Norfolk
Manchester, Bolton and Bury Reservoir - Greater Manchester
March Ghyll Reservoir - Cumbria
Martham Broad - Norfolk
Martin Mere - Lancashire
Marton Mere - Lancashire
Meadley Reservoir - Cumbria
Melbury Reservoir- Devon
Meldon Reservoir- Devon
Midhope Reservoir - South Yorkshire
Molesey Reservoirs - Surrey
More Hall Reservoir - South Yorkshire
Mossy Moor Reservoir - North Yorkshire

N
Naden Reservoirs (Higher, Middle and Lower) - Greater Manchester
Nanpantan Reservoir - Leicestershire
Naseby Reservoir - Northamptonshire
Netherton Reservoir - West Midlands
New Years Bridge Reservoir - Greater Manchester
Norfolk Broads - Norfolk
Norman Hill Reservoir- Greater Manchester
Nutscale Reservoir - Somerset

O
Ogden Reservoir - Greater Manchester
Ogden Reservoir (Lancashire)  - Lancashire
Ogston Reservoir - Derbyshire
Old Ford- Greater London
Oldbury Reservoir - Warwickshire
Olton Reservoir - West Midlands
Orchardleigh Lake - Somerset
Ormesby Broad - Norfolk
Ormesby Little Broad - Norfolk
Oulston Reservoir - North Yorkshire
Oulton Broad - Suffolk

P
Packington Lakes - Warwickshire
Pebley Reservoir - South Yorkshire
Pennington Flash - Leigh
Pennington Reservoir - Cumbria
Piethorne Reservoir - Greater Manchester
Pitsford Water - Northamptonshire
Poaka Beck Reservoir - Cumbria
Porth Reservoir- Cornwall
Powdermill Reservoir - East Sussex

Q
Queen Elizabeth II Reservoir - Surrey
Queen Mary Reservoir - Surrey
Queen Mother Reservoir - Surrey

R
Rake Brook Reservoir - Lancashire
Ranworth Broad - Norfolk
Ravensthorpe Reservoir - Northamptonshire
Readycon Dean Reservoir - Greater Manchester
Redbrook Reservoir - West Yorkshire
Redmires Reservoirs - South Yorkshire
Rhodeswood Reservoir - Derbyshire
Ridgegate Reservoir - Cheshire
Ringstone Edge Reservoir - West Yorkshire
Rivelin Dams - South Yorkshire
Roadford Lake - Devon
Rockland Broad - Norfolk
Rollesby Broad - Norfolk
Rooden Reservoir - Greater Manchester
Roundhill Reservoir - North Yorkshire
Royd Moor Reservoir - South Yorkshire
Rudyard Lake - Staffordshire
Rumworth Lodge Reservoir- Greater Manchester
Rutland Water - Rutland
Ryburn Reservoir - West Yorkshire
Rydal Water - Cumbria

S
Saddington Reservoir - Leicestershire
Salhouse Broad - Norfolk
Sandhill Lake - Nottinghamshire
Scammonden Reservoir - West Yorkshire
Scar House Reservoir - North Yorkshire
Scarborough Mere - North Yorkshire
Scargill Reservoir - North Yorkshire
Scout Dike Reservoir - South Yorkshire
Selset Reservoir- County Durham
Semerwater - North Yorkshire
Serpentine - Greater London
Shustoke Reservoirs - Warwickshire
Siblyback Lake- Cornwall
Simpson Ground Reservoir - Cumbria
Slade Reservoir- Devon
Smiddy Shaw Reservoir- County Durham
Snailsden Reservoir - South Yorkshire
Spring Mill Reservoir - Lancashire
Springs Reservoir - Lancashire
Stain Hill Reservoirs - Surrey
Staines Reservoirs - Surrey
Stanford Reservoir - Leicestershire/Northamptonshire
Staunton Harold Reservoir - Leicestershire
Stithians Reservoir- Cornwall
Stoke Newington West Reservoir - Greater London
Stowe Pool - Staffordshire
Strines Reservoir - South Yorkshire
Strinesdale Reservoir - Greater Manchester
Strumpshaw Fen - Norfolk
Sulby Reservoir (Northamptonshire) - Northamptonshire
Sunnyside Reservoir - Surrey
Sutton reservoir - Cheshire
Sutton Bingham Reservoir - Somerset
Sutton Broad - Norfolk
Swellands Reservoir - West Yorkshire
Swineshaw Reservoirs - Greater Manchester
Swinsty Reservoir - North Yorkshire
Swithland Reservoir - Leicestershire
Sywell Reservoir - Northamptonshire

T
Talkin Tarn - Cumbria
Tardebigge Reservoir - Worcestershire
Ten Acre Reservoir - North Yorkshire
The Mere - Shropshire
Thirlmere - Cumbria
Thornton Reservoir - Leicestershire
Thornton Steward Reservoir - North Yorkshire
Thorpe Malsor reservoir - Northamptonshire
Thrapston Sailing Lake - Northamptonshire
Thruscross Reservoir - Yorkshire
Tilgate Lake - West Sussex
Tittesworth Reservoir - Staffordshire
Torside Reservoir - Derbyshire
Tottiford Reservoir- Devon
Trenchford Reservoir- Devon
Trentabank Reservoir - Cheshire
Tring Reservoirs - Hertfordshire
Turkey Broad - Norfolk
Turnstall Reservoir- County Durham
Turton and Entwistle Reservoir - Lancashire

U
Ullswater - Cumbria
Underbank Reservoir - South Yorkshire
Upper and Lower Bardon Reservoirs
Upper Derwent Valley - Derbyshire
Upper Rivington Reservoir - Lancashire
Upper Roddlesworth Reservoir - Lancashire
Upton Broad - Norfolk

V
Valehouse Reservoir - Derbyshire
Ventford Reservoir - Devon
Virginia Water Lake - Berkshire

W
Walkerwood Reservoir - Greater Manchester
Walshaw Dean Reservoirs - West Yorkshire
Walthamstow Reservoirs - Greater London
Warwick Reservoir- Greater London
Waskerley Reservoir - County Durham
Wast Water - Cumbria
Watergrove Reservoir - Greater Manchester
Wayoh Reservoir - Lancashire
Weecher Reservoir - South Yorkshire
Weir Wood Reservoir - West Sussex
Welford Reservoir - Northamptonshire
West Warwick Reservoir - London
Weston Turville Reservoir - Buckinghamshire
Wet Sleddale Reservoir - Cumbria
Wharncliffe Reservoir - South Yorkshire
Wheatfen Broad - Norfolk
Whitlingham Great Broad - Norfolk
William Girling Reservoir - Greater London
Wilton Water - Wiltshire
Wimbleball Lake - Somerset
Windermere - Cumbria
Windleden Reservoirs - South Yorkshire
Winscar Reservoir - South Yorkshire
Winsford flashes - Cheshire
Winterburn Reservoir - North Yorkshire
Wistlandpound Reservoir - Devon
Witton Lakes - West Midlands
Womack Water - Norfolk
Woodhead Reservoir - Derbyshire
Wormleighton Reservoir -Warwickshire
Worsbrough Reservoir - South Yorkshire
Worthington Lakes - Greater Manchester
Wraysbury Reservoir - Surrey
Wroxham Broad - Norfolk
Wychall Reservoir - Birmingham

Y
Yarrow Reservoir - Lancashire
Yeoman Hey Reservoir - Greater Manchester

See also

List of lakes in the Lake District
List of loughs of Ireland
List of lochs of Scotland
List of lakes of Wales
List of dams and reservoirs in the United Kingdom
List of lakes and tarns in North Yorkshire